Joanna Lambert is a tech and finance industry executive. She has worked for American Express and PayPal. At PayPal she was in charge of Venmo. In 2018 she was put in charge of Verizon assets including Yahoo Finance, Tanda, TechCrunch, and Engadget. She is from Australia and graduated from the Queensland University of Technology.

References

Queensland University of Technology alumni
Women corporate executives
Living people
PayPal people
American Express people
Verizon Communications people
Year of birth missing (living people)